George W. Orff (1835-1908), was an American architect of Bangor, Maine and Minnesota.

Life and career
George W. Orff was born March 3, 1835, in Bangor, Maine to Edward F. Orff and Sarah (Yates) Orff. He was educated in the public schools and trained as a carpenter. However, he had other ambitions and in 1861 went to Boston to train as an architect. He is believed to have studied with Calvin Ryder, a Maine native who designed several buildings in Bangor. In 1870 he returned to Bangor and established himself as an architect, practicing there for eight years. One of his first works, the Adams-Pickering Block in Bangor, is the largest surviving project in Maine. In the winter of 1878 he left Bangor and moved west, settling in Minneapolis in the spring of 1879. He was soon joined by his brother, Fremont D. Orff, who worked as a draftsman until they formed a partnership in 1881. In the 1880s and 1890s they employed several talented designers, including Francis W. Fitzpatrick from 1888 to 1889 and Edgar E. Joralemon. In 1893 the partnership was expanded to include Joralemon. The Orff brothers and Joralemon practiced as Orff & Joralemon until the partnership was dissolved in 1897. Fremont D. Orff succeeded to the practice, with the elder Orff being appointed a superintendent of construction for the Minneapolis public schools. Circa 1905 Orff left Minneapolis and returned to his native Bangor, where he died in 1908.

Personal life
Orff died March 11, 1908, in Bangor. His wife had died circa 1903 in Minneapolis. They had no children. He was buried in Mount Hope Cemetery in Bangor.

Legacy
A number of his works are listed on the United States National Register of Historic Places.

Architectural works
 Old Town Town Hall, Old Town, Maine (1870–71, demolished)
 Adams-Pickering Block, Bangor, Maine (1871, NRHP 1974)
 House for Samuel Kidder Whiting, Ellsworth, Maine (1871, NRHP 1983)
 Holden Town Hall, Holden, Maine (1873, NRHP 2014)
 Orono Town Hall, Orono, Maine (1873–74, burned 1891)
 Double house for George W. Orff and George J. Poole, Bangor, Maine (1874)
 House for Taylor Durgin, Bangor, Maine (1874)
 House for Jones P. Veazie, Bangor, Maine (1874–75, NRHP 1988)
 Emerson Block, Bangor, Maine (1875, demolished)
 Hatch Block, Bangor, Maine (1875, demolished)
 Bank Block, Dexter, Maine (1876, NRHP 1999)
 Batchelder-Mitchell Block, Bangor, Maine (1876, demolished)
 House for James A. Robinson, Bangor, Maine (1878)
 House for Roscoe Hersey, Stillwater, Minnesota (1879–80, NRHP 1982)
 Pioneer Block, Eau Claire, Wisconsin (1882, NRHP 1980)
 Panama Flats, St. Paul, Minnesota (1886)
 Mutual Block, Minneapolis, Minnesota (1888 et seq., demolished)
 Athletic Park, Minneapolis, Minnesota (1889, demolished 1901)
 House for George W. Van Dusen, Minneapolis, Minnesota (1891–93, NRHP 1995)
 House for Edmund G. Walton, Minneapolis, Minnesota (1892, demolished 1959)
 North Dakota Soldiers' Home, Lisbon, North Dakota (1892–93, demolished)
 House for John E. Lockwood, Minneapolis, Minnesota (1893)
 Bayfield County Courthouse, Washburn, Wisconsin (1894–96, NRHP 1975)
 Waseca County Courthouse, Waseca, Minnesota (1896–97, NRHP 1982)

Gallery of architectural works

Notes

References

Architects from Bangor, Maine
Architects from Minneapolis